New Lebanon Local Schools is a school district in New Lebanon, Ohio.

Schools
Dixie High School
Dixie Middle School
Dixie Elementary School

External links
Official Site

Education in Montgomery County, Ohio
School districts in Ohio